Wendell Rollins (June 17, 1917 – December 8, 1990) was an American cyclist. He competed in the individual and team road race events at the 1948 Summer Olympics.

References

External links
 

1917 births
1990 deaths
American male cyclists
Olympic cyclists of the United States
Cyclists at the 1948 Summer Olympics
Sportspeople from Salt Lake City
Cyclists from Utah